The 1905 Cork Senior Hurling Championship was supposed to be the 19th staging of the Cork Senior Hurling Championship, however, due to a delay in the completion of the 1904 championship it never took place.

St. Finbarr’s were the defending champions.

St. Finbarr's were subsequently awarded the title after winning the 1906 championship.

References

Cork Senior Hurling Championship
Cork Senior Hurling Championship